Zachary Fucale (born May 28, 1995) is a Canadian professional ice hockey goaltender for the  Washington Capitals of the National Hockey League (NHL). He was selected by the Montreal Canadiens in the second round (36th overall) of the 2013 NHL Entry Draft.

Playing career

Junior
Fucale was born in Laval, Quebec, but grew up in Rosemère, Quebec.

Before being drafted into major junior hockey, Fucale played for the Saint-Eustache Vikings of the Quebec AAA Midget Hockey League.  The Halifax Mooseheads selected Fucale eleventh overall in the 2011 Quebec Major Junior Hockey League (QMJHL) Entry Draft.

In his first season with the Mooseheads, Fucale set a QMJHL record for most wins by a rookie with 32. For his performance, he was named to the QMJHL all-rookie team and awarded the Raymond Lagacé Trophy as defensive rookie of the year.

In 2012, Fucale was named to the Subway Super Series as a QMJHL representative. On November 8, 2012, Fucale made the start for team QMJHL in the series and stopped all 10 shots he faced before being replaced halfway through the game.
In November 2012, Fucale was named the #1 North American Goaltender in the NHL Central Scouting rankings for the upcoming 2013 NHL Draft.

The 2012–2013 campaign saw Fucale become the Mooseheads' all-time leader in wins with 79, surpassing the mark previously held by Jean-Sébastien Giguère. During the 2012–13 playoffs, he maintained a goals-against average (GAA) of 2.02 and a save percentage of 0.918, recording 16 wins with the Mooseheads against only one loss as they captured their first President's Cup (QMJHL).

In the 2013 MasterCard Memorial Cup tournament held at Saskatoon, Saskatchewan, Fucale maintained a 0.902 save percentage while maintaining a 3.52 GAA to help the Halifax Mooseheads capture their first-ever Memorial Cup. Playing with a talented Mooseheads club that included future NHL rookie of the year Nathan MacKinnon and Canadian Hockey League player of the year Jonathan Drouin, Fucale turned aside 40 shots to beat the Portland Winterhawks 6–4 in the championship game. He was named to the tournament all-star team.

On January 21, 2014, Fucale became the youngest goalie to reach 100 wins in QMJHL history, at 18 years, 7.8 months. At the same time he set a new record for achieving that mark in the fewest games, winning his hundredth game in 145 starts.  The record was previously held by Jacques Cloutier of the Trois-Rivières Draveurs who was 19 when he reached 100 wins in 150 games in 1979.

On November 28, 2014, Fucale recorded his 124th regular season win, passing Olivier Roy for second place among QMJHL goaltenders for most career wins and putting him within 18 wins of Cloutier's all-time record.

Fucale was traded to the Quebec Remparts on December 19, 2014. On his departure from Halifax, he was the club's all-time leader in regular season wins (126), playoff wins (35), and shutouts (15).  In an unusual step for an active player, Fucale returned to his former club 22 days after he was traded to be honoured with an emotional eight-minute pre-game tribute.

In May 2015, Fucale led the Quebec Remparts to the President Cup finals after defeating the Cape Breton Screaming Eagles, Charlottetown Islanders, and Moncton Wildcats. The team lost to the Rimouski Océanic in double overtime of the seventh and final game of the series. Fucale was still able to make a return to the national MasterCard Memorial Cup championship, by virtue of Quebec's status as host; however, the team was eliminated by the Western Hockey League's Kelowna Rockets, 9–3, in the semi-final.

Professional
During the 2013 NHL Entry Draft, Fucale was the top goalie taken, selected 36th overall by the Montreal Canadiens. Following training camp in 2014, the Canadiens returned Fucale to the Halifax Mooseheads for his final junior year. In 2015, Fucale played his first pre-season game in a Habs uniform, giving up two goals, including the overtime winner, in a 2–1 loss to the Toronto Maple Leafs on September 22.

On September 26, 2015, the Canadiens announced that Fucale was being reassigned for the 2015–16 season to the St. John's IceCaps of the American Hockey League, where he shared netminder duties with Dustin Tokarski. On November 30, the team recalled Fucale from the AHL to become Mike Condon's back-up goalie during Carey Price's recovery from an injury.

During the 2016–17 season, Fucale played for the Brampton Beast (ECHL). Entering the playoffs, he had already established a number of franchise records including games played, wins (25) and goals against average. He also took time out in December to lead Canada to a Spengler Cup Champion as the team's only ECHL representative and the youngest player on the roster.

On July 1, 2018, after he was not tendered a qualifying offer to remain with the Canadiens, Fucale signed as a free agent to a one-year, two-way deal with the Vegas Golden Knights. After attending the Golden Knights and Wolves training camp, Fucale was assigned for the majority of the 2018–19 season to ECHL affiliate, the Fort Wayne Komets. Collecting 20 wins in 34 regular season games, Fucale also made 5 appearances with the Chicago Wolves in the AHL. On June 25, 2019, Fucale was not tendered a qualifying offer with the Golden Knights, releasing him to free agency.

On July 2, 2019, Fucale agreed to a one-year AHL contract with the Syracuse Crunch, affiliate to the Tampa Bay Lightning. Signed to add depth to the Crunch, Fucale played primarily with ECHL affiliate club the Orlando Solar Bears. After 24 games with the Solar Bears and a single appearance with the Crunch, Fucale was released from his contract midway into the 2019–20 season, in order to sign a contract with his first European club, EHC Red Bull München of the DEL on February 18, 2020. Due to injury, Fucale failed to feature in the DEL before the cancellation of the season due to the COVID-19 pandemic.

On August 19, 2020, the Washington Capitals signed Fucale as a free agent to a one-year, two-way contract worth $700,000.

Fucale made his NHL debut on November 11, 2021, registering a 21-save shutout. In doing so he became the first goalie in Washington Capitals history to register a shutout in his NHL debut, and the first NHL goalie to do so since Garret Sparks. In his second NHL game, on January 8, 2022, he did not surrender a goal until late in the third period, setting a new NHL record for the longest shutout streak to begin a career.

International play

Fucale won gold at the 2012 Ivan Hlinka U18 Memorial Tournament as a member of Team Canada. Fucale played in four of the five tournament games, shutting out Finland 4–0 in the gold medal game.

Fucale was named to Canada's roster for the 2014 and 2015 World Junior Championship. After Canada finished a disappointing fourth at the 2014 event in Sweden, Fucale led Team Canada to a gold medal, their first in five years, at the 2015 IIHF World Junior Championship. In so doing, Fucale improved his save percentage to .949 over five games in 2015, up from .902 in the previous tournament; his goals-against average improved to 1.20 from 2.42.  With eight wins, Fucale ties Stéphane Fiset (1989/1990) and Marc-André Fleury (2003/2004) for most wins by a Canadian goaltender at the IIHF U20 tournament.

Fucale has represented Canada three times at the annual invitational Spengler Cup tournament, leading Team Canada to gold medals in 2016 and 2019 and to a silver medal in 2018. In the 2019 tournament, Fucale was named to the tournament all star team after allowing only one goal in three starts, recording two shutouts and a 0.33 goals-against average.

Career statistics

Regular season and playoffs

International

Awards and honours

References

External links

1995 births
Living people
Brampton Beast players
Canadian ice hockey goaltenders
Chicago Wolves players
Fort Wayne Komets players
Halifax Mooseheads players
Hershey Bears players
Ice hockey people from Quebec
Laval Rocket players
Montreal Canadiens draft picks
Orlando Solar Bears (ECHL) players
People from Rosemère, Quebec
Quebec Remparts players
Sportspeople from Laval, Quebec
St. John's IceCaps players
South Carolina Stingrays players
Syracuse Crunch players
Washington Capitals players